Ajay Rastogi (born 18 June 1958) is a judge of Supreme Court of India. He is former chief justice of Tripura High Court. He is also former judge of Rajasthan High Court.

Career 
Shri Justice Ajay Rastogi, B.Com., LL.B., was born in 1958. He was enrolled as an Advocate in 1982 and practiced in the Rajasthan High Court in Constitutional, Civil Service and Labour matters. His field of specialization is service and labour law. He was appointed an additional judge of the Rajasthan High Court on 2 September 2004 and permanent judge on 29 May 2006. He was appointed chief justice of the Tripura High Court on 1 March 2018. He was appointed judge of Supreme Court of India on 2 November 2018.

References

1958 births
Living people
21st-century Indian judges
Chief Justices of the Tripura High Court
Judges of the Rajasthan High Court
Justices of the Supreme Court of India
People from Jaipur